Eupithecia lactibasis is a moth in the family Geometridae. It is found in north- India (Darjeeling) and Nepal.

References

Moths described in 2000
lactibasis
Moths of Asia